El-Creepo! is the debut album by former Dog Fashion Disco and current Polkadot Cadaver as well as Knives Out! singer Todd Smith. Unlike his aforementioned bands, El-Creepo! is a more acoustic approach to songwriting. However, the title cut has been performed with Polkadot Cadaver since its release. The first four tracks were released through Myspace several months prior to the release of the album.

Track listing

Personnel
Todd Smith - vocals, acoustic and electric guitars, bass, piano and keyboards, production, recording
John Ensminger - all acoustic drums
Jasan Stepp - cello (track 13)
Heather Berry - additional vocals (track 7)

Additional personnel
Drew Lamond – production
Steve Wright – mixing
Kiyarn Taghan – album artwork
Stacie Becker – album artwork
Shane Tuttle – album layout

References

External links
El-Creepo! on MySpace
El-Creepo on Rotten Records

2009 debut albums
Todd Smith (musician) albums